Allien Whittaker (born 19 June 1983 in Jamaica) is a Jamaican retired footballer.

References

Association football goalkeepers
Living people
Jamaican footballers
1983 births
Jamaica international footballers